Trichotomoxia grosseantennalis is a species of beetle in the genus Trichotomoxia of the family Mordellidae . It was described in 1955.

References

Mordellidae
Beetles described in 1955